Selvaraju Sandrakasi (born 21 July 1985) is a field hockey player from Taiping, Perak, Malaysia. Selvaraju made his international debut in the Sultan Azlan Shah Cup in 2006.

Career
He played in three foreign leagues. He first played in Germany in 2006 and scored five goals in 12 Division One matches for Moenchengladbach. In 2008, he played for Berlin and scored seven goals in 10 matches. He was supposed to return to Berlin to continue playing for the Berliner HC in April but injury sidelined him. He earned another call-up from Berlin for 2010 German League.

In October 2009, Selvaraju had a stint in New Zealand for Division One side Midlands. He scored four goals in eight matches. He also featured for Racing Club de France for two months from March 2010. He scored four goals in 12 French Division One matches. He received another invitation in 2010 and was sought by clubs in Europe, Australia and India.

He plays the role of midfielder for UniKL in the Malaysia Hockey League. He again received invitations to play for Berlin and Racing de France and for the first time, he gets an offer to play in England League for Manchester Hockey Club.

References 

1985 births
Living people
Malaysian sportspeople of Indian descent
Malaysian people of Tamil descent
People from Perak
Malaysian male field hockey players